Portals (stylized in all uppercase) is the upcoming third studio album by American singer-songwriter, Melanie Martinez. It is expected to be released on March 31, 2023, through Atlantic Records.

Background 
After releasing her critically acclaimed second studio album with a musical film in 2019, Martinez released her fourth extended play, After School (2020), which served as a deluxe edition for the second studio album. However, the extended play is not connected to the musical film in terms of the timeline.

After being on two-year hiatus for music, Martinez started to archive all of her Instagram posts and teased the upcoming album on February 18, 2023. The singer also released a twelve-second snippet on Spotify.

Promotion 
The teaser video showed a mushroom in a foggy, dream-like forest, with the phrase "RIP Crybaby" engraved in its stem (in all uppercase), accompanied by a snippet of a new song. Several more teasers were posted over the next few days on all her social media platforms, representing the "themes of rebirth, growing embryos, and eggs incubating in forests."

On February 22, 2023, she uploaded a one-minute-long teaser "of herself hatching from an egg as a pink, deep sea-styled creature." The teaser also included the album's name and release date. Her official website was also updated, showcasing the album cover, and merchandise for the album became available to the public for pre-order. Before releasing the lead single of the album, Martinez revealed the album's title track songs through her official website.

Singles 
In March of 2023, Martinez uploaded a post to Instagram featuring a cryptic message and a photo showcasing the alter-ego pink alien character "emerging from a prone human form." The post also showed a set of lyrics, a release date, and the title of "Death", the lead single for the album, released on March 17, 2023. The single was written and produced by Martinez, with CJ Baran co-producing.

Track listing 
Track listing adapted from Melanie Martinez's official website.

Notes:
 All tracks are stylized in all uppercase.

Personnel

Musicians 

 Melanie Martinez – vocals (track 1)

Production 

 Melanie Martinez – producer (track 1)
 CJ Baran – producer (track 1)

Release history

Notes

References 

 
2023 albums
Atlantic Records albums
Melanie Martinez (singer) albums
Upcoming albums